Anekes sculpturata is a species of sea snail, a marine gastropod mollusk, unassigned in the superfamily Seguenzioidea.

Description
The shell grows to  a height of 1 mm.

Distribution
This species occurs in the Bay of Biscay and in the Mediterranean Sea.

References

External links
 

sculpturata
Gastropods described in 1992